Kitty van Male (born 5 June 1988) is a Dutch field hockey player.

At the 2012 Summer Olympics, she competed for the Netherlands women's national field hockey team in the women's event, where the Netherlands won gold. On club level she plays for AH&BC.

References

External links
 

1988 births
Living people
Dutch female field hockey players
Field hockey players at the 2012 Summer Olympics
Medalists at the 2012 Summer Olympics
Olympic field hockey players of the Netherlands
Olympic gold medalists for the Netherlands
Olympic medalists in field hockey
Sportspeople from Amstelveen
Field hockey players at the 2016 Summer Olympics
Medalists at the 2016 Summer Olympics
Olympic silver medalists for the Netherlands
Female field hockey forwards
20th-century Dutch women
21st-century Dutch women